Modesto Gavazzi, O.F.M. Conv. (died 1608) was a Roman Catholic prelate who served as Bishop of Alife (1598–1608).

Biography
Modesto Gavazzi was ordained a priest in the Order of Friars Minor Conventual.
On 7 August 1598, he was appointed during the papacy of Pope Clement VIII as Bishop of Alife.
He served as Bishop of Alife until his death in 1608.

References

External links and additional sources
 (for Chronology of Bishops) 
 (for Chronology of Bishops) 

16th-century Italian Roman Catholic bishops
17th-century Italian Roman Catholic bishops
Bishops appointed by Pope Clement VIII
1608 deaths
Conventual Franciscan bishops